Blackie may refer to:


Places
 Blackie, Alberta, Canada
 Blackie Lake, California, United States

People and fictional characters 
 Blackie (surname)
 Blackie (nickname), including people and fictional characters nicknamed either Blackie or Blacky
 Blackie (musician), stage name of American rapper Michael LaCour (born 1987)

Animals
 Blackie (American horse), a Californian horse who became a local mascot
 Blackie (army horse), a British Army horse

Other uses
 Blackie (guitar), Eric Clapton's favorite Fender Stratocaster guitar
 Blackie and Son, a former Glasgow-based publishing house
 South African "Blackie" 0-4-2WT, a railroad locomotive

See also
 Blxckie, South African rapper Sihle Sithole (born 1999)